Michelle Barr (born 19 October 1978) is a Scottish football coach and former player who is the head coach of Old Dominion Monarchs college soccer team. She formerly played in the Scottish Women's Premier League for both Celtic and Rangers. She has previously played professionally in the Icelandic Úrvalsdeild and has been capped for the Scotland women's national team on 87 occasions.

Career
In 1999, Barr won the first Scottish Sports Aid Foundation award for women's football, £500.

As a player, she has won every domestic honour in the Scottish women's game and was a runner-up in the English FA Women's Cup Final in 2002 with Doncaster Belles.

Barr made her debut for the Scotland women's national team in 1996 against the Republic of Ireland and went on to win 87 caps, scoring once.

She played professionally in Iceland for ÍBV between 2001 and 2004, becoming club captain.

She joined the coaching staff at Dartmouth College as a volunteer assistant in 2005, becoming assistant coach to Angie Hind the following season. Barr and Hind both left Dartmouth in December 2010.

Barr was employed by the Scottish Football Association as National Youth Support Programme Manager for Girls/Women's football and is also assistant coach of the national Under-15 Girls team.

She joined Rangers for the 2013 Scottish Women's Premier League season. In May 2014 she became head coach of the Old Dominion Monarchs, based in Norfolk, Virginia.

References

External links
Michelle Barr Celtic FC profile
Michelle Barr Rangers FC profile

1978 births
Living people
Scottish women's footballers
Scotland women's international footballers
FA Women's National League players
Sportspeople from Lanark
Doncaster Rovers Belles L.F.C. players
Leeds United Women F.C. players
Celtic F.C. Women players
Footballers from South Lanarkshire
F.C. Kilmarnock Ladies players
Women's association football central defenders
Scottish Women's Premier League players
Rangers W.F.C. players
Scottish expatriate sportspeople in Iceland
Scottish expatriate women's footballers
Expatriate women's footballers in Iceland
Expatriate women's soccer players in the United States
Scottish expatriate sportspeople in the United States
USL W-League (1995–2015) players
Michelle Barr
Dartmouth Big Green women's soccer coaches
Scottish football managers
Female association football managers
Old Dominion University faculty
Boston Renegades players